The following is an alphabetical list of topics related to the Dominican Republic.

0–9

.do – Internet country code top-level domain for the Dominican Republic

A
Adjacent country:

Americas
North America
North Atlantic Ocean
West Indies
Mar Caribe (Caribbean Sea)
Antillas (Antilles)
Antillas Mayores (Greater Antilles)
La Española (Hispaniola)
Antilles
Atlantic Ocean
Atlas of the Dominican Republic

C
Capital of the Dominican Republic:  Santo Domingo de Guzmán
Caribbean
Caribbean Community (CARICOM)
Caribbean Sea
Catholic Church in the Dominican Republic
Categories:
:Category:Dominican Republic
:Category:Buildings and structures in the Dominican Republic
:Category:Communications in the Dominican Republic
:Category:Dominican Republic culture
:Category:Dominican Republic people
:Category:Dominican Republic stubs
:Category:Dominican Republic templates
:Category:Dominican Republic-related lists
:Category:Economy of the Dominican Republic
:Category:Education in the Dominican Republic
:Category:Environment of the Dominican Republic
:Category:Geography of the Dominican Republic
:Category:Government of the Dominican Republic
:Category:Health in the Dominican Republic

:Category:History of the Dominican Republic
:Category:Law of the Dominican Republic
:Category:Military of the Dominican Republic
:Category:Politics of the Dominican Republic
:Category:Science and technology in the Dominican Republic
:Category:Society of the Dominican Republic
:Category:Sport in the Dominican Republic
:Category:Transportation in the Dominican Republic
commons:Category:Dominican Republic
Coat of arms of the Dominican Republic
Communications in the Dominican Republic
Congress of the Dominican Republic
Cuisine of the Dominican Republic
Culture of the Dominican Republic

D
Demographics of the Dominican Republic
Dominican American
Dominican immigration to Puerto Rico
Dominican Republic (República Dominicana)
Dominican Republic national football team
Dominican peso
Dominican Spanish

E
Economy of the Dominican Republic

F

Federación Dominicana de Fútbol
Flag of the Dominican Republic
Foreign relations of the Dominican Republic

G
Geographic Regions of the Dominican Republic
Geography of the Dominican Republic
Greater Antilles

H
Hispaniola
History of the Dominican Republic

I
International Organization for Standardization (ISO)
ISO 3166-1 alpha-2 country code for the Dominican Republic: DO
ISO 3166-1 alpha-3 country code for the Dominican Republic: DOM
ISO 3166-2:DO region codes for the Dominican Republic
Islands of the Dominican Republic:
Eastern portion of the island of La Española (Hispaniola)
Saona Island
Catalina Island, Dominican Republic
Beata Island
Cayo Levantado
Silver Bank
Navidad Bank

L
La Española
Lago Enriquillo - The lowest point in the Dominican Republic, Hispaniola, the Caribbean, and on any ocean island
Latin America
Law of the Dominican Republic
LGBT rights in the Dominican Republic (Gay rights)
Lists related to the Dominican Republic:
Diplomatic missions of the Dominican Republic
Geographic Regions of the Dominican Republic
List of airports in the Dominican Republic
List of banks of the Dominican Republic
List of cities in the Dominican Republic
List of colonial governors of Santo Domingo
List of companies of the Dominican Republic
List of diplomatic missions in the Dominican Republic
List of islands of the Dominican Republic
List of people from the Dominican Republic
List of players from Dominican Republic in Major League Baseball
List of presidents of the Dominican Republic
List of rivers of the Dominican Republic
List of universities in the Dominican Republic
List of wettest known tropical cyclones in the Dominican Republic
Topic outline of the Dominican Republic

M
Mar Caribe
Military of the Dominican Republic
Music of the Dominican Republic

N
Nigua Sugar Mill
North America
North Atlantic Ocean
Northern Hemisphere

P
Pico Duarte – highest point in the Dominican Republic, Hispaniola, and the entire Caribbean
Politics of the Dominican Republic
Pomier Caves - series of well-known caves that contain well-preserved 2,000 year old Taíno rock art 
Port of Santo Domingo
Prostitution in the Dominican Republic
Provinces of the Dominican Republic
Painters of the Dominican Republic

R
Religion in the Dominican Republic
República Dominicana (Dominican Republic)

S
Sanate Sugar Mill
Santo Domingo de Guzmán – Capital of the Dominican Republic
Spanish colonization of the Americas
Spanish language

T
Topic outline of the Dominican Republic
Transport in the Dominican Republic

U
United Nations founding member state 1945
Universities in the Dominican Republic

W
Water supply and sanitation in the Dominican Republic
West Indies
Western Hemisphere

Wikipedia:WikiProject Topic outline/Drafts/Topic outline of the Dominican Republic
Writers of the Dominican Republic

See also

List of Caribbean-related topics
List of international rankings
Lists of country-related topics
Topic outline of geography
Topic outline of North America
Topic outline of the Dominican Republic
United Nations

References

External links

 
Dominican Republic